The following is a list of prominent people belonging to the Naga people.

Artists

Actors/Actresses

 Zhokhoi Chüzho
 Andrea Kevichüsa
 Mengu Süokhrie

Filmmakers

 Sesino Yhoshü

Musicians

 Jiangam Kamei (1963–2016)
 Silas Kikon (1956–2016)
 Macnivil
 Rewben Mashangva
 Alobo Naga
 Tetseo Sisters
 Methaneilie Solo
 Jonathan Yhome

Athletes

Archery 
 Chekrovolü Swüro

Cricket

Football
 Talimeren Ao (1918–1998)
 Makan Chote
 Grace Dangmei
 James Kithan
 Wungngayam Muirang
 Hormipam Ruivah
 Khwetelhi Thopi
 Kivi Zhimomi

Sepak takraw 
 Holshe Khrie-o
 Viseyie Koso

Entrepreneurs

 Zuboni Hümtsoe (1990–2017)
 Hekani Jakhalu Kense, social entrepreneur

Politicians and Nationalist leaders

Nationalists Leaders

 Tubu Kevichüsa (1948–1996), General Secretary of the Naga National Council
 S. S. Khaplang (1940–2017), leader of NSCN-K
 Jadonang Malangmei (1905–1931), Naga spiritual leader and political activist
 Thuingaleng Muivah (b. 1934), present General Secretary of the NSCN-IM
 Gaidinliu Pamei (1915–1993), Naga spiritual and political leader who led a revolt against British rule in India
 A. Z. Phizo (1913–1990), leader of Naga National Council
 Isak Chishi Swu (1929–2016), chairman of the Nationalist Socialist Council of Nagaland
 Khodao Yanthan (1923–2010), member of Naga National Council

Politicians

Religious personalities

 Nitoy Achümi (1935-2005), Bible Translator
 Wati Aier, Theologian
 L. Kijungluba Ao (1906–97), baptist missionary
 Longri Ao (1906–1981) missionary to the Konyak Nagas
 S. Anungla, first woman pastor among the Chang Nagas
 Neiliezhü Üsou (1941–2009), influential Baptist preacher and church musician

Scholars and Writers

Poets and writers
 Temsüla Ao, poet, short story writer and ethnographer
 Monalisa Changkija, author and journalist
 Easterine Kire, author and poet

Scholars 
 Mayangnokcha Ao (1901–1988), educationist and writer
 Piyong Temjen Jamir (1934–2021)
 Gangmumei Kamei (1939–2017), historian and politician
 Darlando Khathing, former vice chancellor of Central University of Jharkhand
 Dolly Kikon
 P. Kilemsungla, educationist
 Shürhozelie Liezietsu, Tenyidie scholar and politician
 Abraham Lotha, anthropologist

Social activists

 Neidonuo Angami, social worker; shortlisted for the Nobel Peace Prize in 2000
 Alana Golmei, rights activist
 Ringyuichon Vashum, activist

Other notables

Bureaucrats and Government Officials
 Neichülie-ü Nikki Haralu (1918–2016), former Indian Ambassador to Panama
 Razhukhrielie Kevichüsa (1941–2022), bureaucrat and musician
 Ralengnao Khathing (1912–1990), Army soldier, civil servant and former Indian ambassador to Myanmar
 Armstrong Pame
 Hovithal Sothü

Journalist
 Bano Haralu
 Chalie Kevichüsa (1943–1992)

Judges
 H. K. Sema
 W. A. Shishak

Military and gallantry award recipients
 Keishing Clifford Nongrum (1975–1999), Kargil martyr and Maha Vir chakra awardee
 Neikezhakuo Kengurüse (1974–1999), Kargil martyr and Mahavir chakra awardee

See also
List of people by nationality

References

Naga-related lists

Naga